The Modo was a wireless device developed by Scout electromedia and was officially announced on August 28th, 2000. Utilizing pager networks, the device was designed to provide city-specific "lifestyle" content such as restaurant & bar reviews, movie listings, in addition to original Scout-produced content.

The industrial design was done by IDEO (which took an investment in the startup), while the device software was based on Pixo's operating system (the OS that later powered the Apple iPod). All of the electrical engineering, wireless development, and system development were done in-house by the company.

After the company was funded, one of its venture backers, Flatiron out of Manhattan, backed a similar company,  Vindigo, which aimed to bring a broader range of information to the Palm Pilot platform. Because of Scout's focus on delivering mobile information to a young design-conscious audience that had no interest in using a traditional PDA, Vindigo was considered by the backers to be a complementary product offering.

The modo was advertised heavily in its target markets of Los Angeles, New York, Chicago and San Francisco, and sold in Virgin Megastores in NYC, LA, and San Francisco. The product was launched in late summer 2000 and made it to all three cities, but only shipped for one day in San Francisco. After the company shut down, the press had a field day with the product and its lofty intentions. Over time, it came out that the company's venture backers had left the company to die as many of them experienced their own financial problems (notably Idealab, Flatiron, and Chase Capital).

External links
Idealab's Bill Gross discussing Scout in BusinessWeek
New York Times on the 'PDA for the Tragically Hip'
BusinessWeek discusses modo as part of the post dotcom 'Innovation Drought'
Dennis Crowley's Modo Tribute Page
IDEO Case Study for Scout Electromedia
Speaking, palm-size gadget to show tourists a good time | CNN.com

Pagers